Ahn Chang-ho is a former Justice of the Constitutional Court of Korea.

Career 
1985            Prosecutor, Seoul District Prosecutors' Office

1987            Prosecutor, Seosan Branch of Daejeon District Prosecutors' Office

1988            Prosecutor, Eastern Branch of Busan District Prosecutors' Office

1990            Prosecutor, Southern Branch of Seoul District Prosecutors' Office

1993            Prosecutor, Human Rights Division, Legal Affairs Bureau of Ministry of Justice

1996            Prosecutor, Busan District Prosecutors' Office

1997            Chief Prosecutor, Jeongeup Branch of Jeonju District Prosecutors' Office

1997            Constitution Research Officer, Constitutional Court

1999            Chief, Special Legislation Division, Legal Affairs Bureau of Ministry of Justice

2001            Chief, Planning Division, Planning &Coordination Department of Supreme Prosecutors' Office

2002            Foreign Criminal Senior Prosecutor, Supreme Prosecutors' Office

2003            Chief Prosecutor, Public Security Department of Supreme Prosecutors' Office

2005            Prosecutor, Seoul High Prosecutors' Office

2006            Deputy Chief Prosecutor, Seoul Central District Prosecutors' Office

2007            Deputy Chief Prosecutor, Gwangju High Prosecutors' Office

2008            Chief Prosecutor, Criminal Affairs Department of Supreme Prosecutors' Office

2009            Chief Prosecutor, Daejeon District Prosecutors' Office

2009            Chief Prosecutor, Gwangju High Prosecutors' Office

2011            Chief Prosecutor, Seoul High Prosecutors' Office

Current   Justice, Constitutional Court (since Sep. 20, 2012)

References 
 
 

South Korean judges
Justices of the Constitutional Court of Korea
Living people
1957 births
South Korean prosecutors
Seoul National University alumni